José Fonseca e Costa, GCIH (27 June 1933 – 1 November 2015) was a Portuguese film director. He was one of the founders of the Portuguese Cinema Novo.

Born in Angola, Costa worked as an assistant to Michelangelo Antonioni before becoming one of the leaders of Portugal's 'Young Cinema' in the 1960s.

Filmography
Os Mistérios de Lisboa (2009)
Viuva Rica Solteira Não Fica (2006)
O Fascínio (2003)
Cinco Dias, Cinco Noites (1996)
Os Cornos de Cronos (1991)
A Mulher do Próximo (1988)
Balada da Praia dos Cães (1987)
Sem Sombra de Pecado (1983)
Kilas, o Mau da Fita (1981)
Música, Moçambique! (1980)
Os Demónios de Alcácer Quibir (1977)
O Recado (1971)
Voar (1970)
The Pearl of Atlantic (1969)
Regresso à Terra do Sol (1967)
A Cidade (1967)
A Metafísica do Chocolate (1967)

Bibliographic references
  O Cais do Olhar by José de Matos-Cruz, Portuguese Cinematheque, 1999

See also
 Cinema of Portugal

References

Portuguese film directors
1933 births
2015 deaths
Golden Globes (Portugal) winners